Sound of The Rising Sun is the debut LP by Raleigh hip-hop artist Drique London. The album was released digitally on May 13, 2015, by DOC Music Group. It features Carlitta Durand, Carrington, Fresh Daily, Like Of Pac Div, Justin Alexander and Donovan McCray. Production was handled by Majestic, U’nique Music & The Candidates.  The album has found its way on numerous hiphop sites such as 2DopeBoyz, Funkmaster Flex, DJ Enuff, and DJ Booth 
The first single off the album was titled “You Don’t Know”. The second single was titled “Laybach”.

Music videos
The first video was shot for “You Don’t Know in North Carolina by Vinark Motion Pictures. A second video, LayBach ft Carringtion, is in the works.

Critical reception
Grungecake Magazine stated that the album was short and sweet. London was able to show his skills by switching flows and riding the beat differently on each song. They would also go on to write that Drique London is a relatable artist, in the vein of most of North Carolina’s most known Hip-Hop artists: J. Cole, Little Brother (group) and Rapsody.

Track listing

 (**) designates additional instrumentation from U’nique Music

References

2015 debut albums